Hip-Hop has been around in Mauritius since it has been on International media. Each generation has their own preference in terms of Rap Artists, but all artists who have been playing on the medias since TuPac have also been aired in Mauritius.

Rap artists such as Dr Dre, Snoop Dogg, Eminem, 50 Cents are extremely popular among Hip-Hop fans in Mauritius in the 1990s. Hip-Hop culture has been widely spread and its sub cultures such as its Mc'ing, BBoying, Graffiti, and DJing are widely practised.

 
The general local Rap scene is quite active but due to the high musical piracy issue, Rap albums have become rare on the national music market.

Some popular active Rappers are Panther Noire, Marki Evolution. Tikkenzo from OSB Crew and Aeiki Latchoum from North Side Zoo are the most popular Rappers, but who have stopped releasing records for a decade now.

Among the most known dance groups, there is Flava Kid'z, Street Elite Crew, La Squad and Da Movement. Some old dance groups who also was quite popular are Alliance Supreme ( no more active ), Cyber Step Breakerz and HipHop Dancers.

Eventually, with the access to YouTube, computer music and music stores by 2000, many fans started into their own Hip Hop adventure on Mauritius Island.

Nowadays there are numerous Home Studios around the Island and good beat makers and producers.

RAP
Rap has been around in Mauritius as early as 1995. The youth generation of 1995-2005 had in their walkman/Discman albums of Tupac, Notorious BIG, Public Enemy, Dr Dre, The Fugees, Method Man, Ice Cube, Snoop Doog, Eminem among all the popular rappers that received media attention at the time.

With a strong influence of the French Rap Scene, with groups like I-AM, NTM, Psy4 de la Rime, Sniper, etc.  young Mauritians eventually started to rap too and the culture has been since present in Mauritius.

The first group to make Rap popular in Mauritius was known as Union Tribal Clan, a group of friends from Residence Kennedy. Another group who managed to get some attention at the time was N.A.S Possi. they have produced one album and have been inactive since 2005.

There was yet no facility to studio recording, as laptops and internet were extremely difficult to afford, emcees started to rap on other artists songs, looping their music.

The culture rapidly spread once Internet and laptops were at affordable prices. They gradually evolved from looping samples of other artists songs to doing their own beat.

Most songs at that time were being recorded either in Scorpion Studio at Petite Rivière, or at Capricorn Studio in the North of the Island.

Nowadays there are a lot of home studios in Mauritius and the Rap Dream each year draws a lot of young artists to start an adventure.

MC Groups

Popular Rappers

Street Dance 

Street Dance

The culture of Street dance was very popular in the 1990 with the Street Brothers, Boogie Side Gang and the Sound systems that was organized by the Otentik Street Brothers.

There were no competitions at the time and no training provided so the culture gradually faded away for some time.

With popular Hollywood films like You Got Served and the Step Up series, some dancers continued to keep the culture alive in Mauritius.

While Alliance Supreme kept the breakdance scene alive and was the only crew until now to have made it until the final of the Indian Ocean Championship Battle de L'Ouest (in 2004), organized by Soul City, Cyber Step Breakerz was the most popular group giving regular shows mixing breakdance with debout dance styles like popping and locking.

In 2010, a contest called Wake Up Session which held regular battles contributed to the rise of battle street dancers in Mauritius. Many crews and solo dancers were formed since and until now contests are carried out for national and international championships.

Street dance contests has been getting very popular with the regular Malta Guinness Street Dance event and more recently in November 2018  the Ministry of Youth and Sports organized a National street dance battle championship, which took place in 9 events and was televised live on National TV.

List of Dance Groups 
 Alliance Supreme 
 Beach Boyz  
 Buruth Family Crew  
 Cyber Step Breakers  
 Flava Kidz  
 Da Movement Squad 
 Mafia Swagg Crew 
 Tic Tac Toe  
 Hip-Hop Dancer Crew  
 Smufflers 
U4Yuh
 Venom
 Street Elite Crew 
Wild Cats
 La Squad
Meyepa Sisters
Zanfan le Sud

List of Popular Dancers 
 As-T
BBoy David 
BBoy Monster
BBoy Tyger
Cedrix Baboo
Dom-K
Donovan Vert
Elizabeth Meyepa
 Emmanuel l'Eveille
Emmanuel Chellen
 Far-out 
Jake Jason Fabre
Jo Wayne
 Kas-T
Nicky Negus
Pascal Lisette
Rachel Meyepa
Slim J
Vivek Kooyela
 Yung-J
 Williams Charlot

As from 2016 there has been several street dance schools founded and workshops going on by local street dancers.

DJing 
DJing is of course one of the most important pillars of Hip-Hop Culture! There are not so many DJs of Hip-Hop on Mauritius Island, as the culture is not so prominent like in the States, but there are some who are famous.

List of DJs

 DJ Steph
 Dj Kingdom
 DJ Alka (Colas N.A.S) a.k.a. Vj Sensation
 DJ Nas-T 
 DJ Master-Crazy
Selektha Nathy

Graffiti 

This culture is not so active in Mauritius, compared to Reunion which is a couple of hundred kilometers away where graffiti can be seen everywhere, you will not see Graffiti tags so much around Mauritius Island.

There are however some nice street art you can see at Port Louis and a couple known graffiti Artists in the small island.

List of some Graffiti Artists:

 Aeiki Latchoum
 Skom
 Resko
 Zo

References

 http://business.mega.mu/2012/08/23/concert-back-basics-mauritian-all-stars/
 https://web.archive.org/web/20160407110638/http://mauritius.usembassy.gov/20121001_pr_dp1.html
 http://blog.airmauritius.com/italian-rapper-mauritian-roots-seeks-tv-show-win/
 http://www.mauritius-tourist-guide.mu/events/hip-hop-wake-up-session/
 http://www.orange.mu/kinews/dossiers/culture-et-loisirs/386557/malta-guinness-street-dance-plateforme-d-rsquo-expression-revee-pour-les-jeunes-de-18-a-24-ans.html
 http://www.lemauricien.com/article/sooklam-appadu-rappeur-engage
 http://www.radiomoris.com/roosta-killah.html
 http://wakeupmauritius.com/2015/11/06/wake-up-street-session/

Hip hop by country
Mauritian music